Arthur Jones may refer to:

Politics 
Arthur Jones, 2nd Viscount Ranelagh (died 1669), Irish politician
Arthur Creech Jones (1891–1964), British trade unionist and politician, Secretary of State for the Colonies, 1946–1950
Arthur Jones (Australian politician) (1892–1976), shearer and member of the Queensland Legislative Assembly
Arthur Probyn Jones (1892–1951), British barrister and Liberal Party politician
Arthur Jones (Conservative politician) (1915–1991), British Member of Parliament, 1962–1979
Arthur L. Jones (1924–2003), American politician, member of the South Dakota House of Representatives
Arthur J. Jones (born 1948), American neo-Nazi Republican congressional candidate

Sports 
Arthur Jones (rugby union) (1857–1919), Welsh rugby union player
Arthur Jones (English cricketer) (1872–1914), England cricket captain and rugby union player
Arthur Jones (Australian cricketer) (1874–1917), Australian cricketer
Arthur Jones (footballer, born 1878) (1878–1939), English footballer
Arthur Kenneth Jones (1887–1975), English badminton player
Arthur Jones (footballer, born 1891) (1891–1915), Australian rules footballer
Arthur W. Jones (1891–?), American college football, basketball, and baseball player and coach
Arthur Jones (baseball) (fl. 1925–1926), American baseball player
Arthur Jones (Nelson footballer) (fl. 1927–1928), English footballer who only made a single professional appearance for Nelson
Arthur Jones (racewalker) (born 1938), British Olympic athlete
Arthur Jones (American football) (born 1986), American football defensive end

Other 
Arthur Llewellyn Jones (1863–1947), British author under the name Arthur Machen
Arthur Duncan-Jones (1879–1955), British Anglican priest and author
Arthur Morris Jones (1889–1980), British missionary and musicologist
Arthur Frederick Jones (1903–1988), American writer and dog-show judge
Arthur E. Jones, American architect
Arthur Jones (inventor) (1926–2007), American inventor of the Nautilus exercise machines
Arthur Jones (bishop) (1934–2021), Australian Anglican priest, Bishop of Gippsland, 1994–2001
Arthur Jones (musician) (1940–1998), American jazz saxophonist

See also
Jones (surname)
Art Jones (disambiguation)